Chaharduli-ye Sharqi Rural District is a rural district (dehestan) in Chaharduli District, Qorveh County, Kurdistan Province, Iran. At the 2006 census, its population was 8,193, in 1,987 families. The rural district has 14 villages.

References 

Rural Districts of Kurdistan Province
Qorveh County